MJHS may refer to:
Metropolitan Jewish Health System, a nonprofit known as "MJHS" in New York City, United States
 Maynard H. Jackson High School, Atlanta, Georgia, United States
 Memphis Jewish High School, Memphis, Tennessee, United States
 Mount Judea High School, Mount Judea, Arkansas, United States
 Mount Juliet High School, Mount Juliet, Tennessee, United States